This is a list of episodes for The Colbert Report in 2011.

2011

January

February

March

April

May

June

July

August

September

October

November

December

Notes
 Hans Beinholtz is a fictional character played by Erik Frandsen.

References

External links 

 
 

2011
2011 American television seasons